In mathematics, a Brieskorn–Grothendieck resolution is a resolution conjectured by Alexander Grothendieck, that in particular gives a resolution of the universal deformation of a Kleinian singularity.   announced the construction of this resolution, and  published the details of Brieskorn's construction.

References

Singularity theory